A random positioning machine, or RPM, rotates biological samples along two independent axes to change their orientation in space in complex ways and so eliminate the effect of gravity.

Description

The RPM is a more sophisticated development of the single-axis clinostat. RPMs usually consist of two independently rotating frames. One frame is positioned inside the other giving a very complex net change of orientation to a biological sample mounted in the middle. The RPM is sometimes wrongly referred to as the "3-D clinostat" (which rotates both axis in the same direction, i.e. both clockwise). It is a microweight ('micro-gravity') simulator that is based on the principle of 'gravity-vector-averaging'. RPM provides a functional volume which is 'exposed' to simulated microweight.
.

Simulated micro-, partial, and hyper gravity 
The concept of 'random' positioning has been used to simulate a micro-gravity environment through the nullification of gravity. This is accomplished by disorientating the target model, or as "vector-averaging". Through the use of a centrifuge, a 'hyper-gravity' gravity can be simulated, as the model will get exposed to a continued accelerated force. In the circumstances of hyper-gravity within a micro-gravity environment, a partial 'Earth' gravity is created. Hyper-gravity simulation is also achieved through the use of larger centrifuges, such as the Large diameter Centrifuge (LDC) at the European Space Agency. The LDC simulated up to twenty times the Earth's gravitational strength. A system developed by Airbus uses an algorithm to simulate partial-gravity through a not fully randomly vector-averaging. The vector-averaging by Airbus' algorithm doesn't average out the vector to null but to a percentage representing simulated partial-gravity. The software controlled RPM for partial-gravity has been bought by Yuri GmbH form whom you can now purchase this.

See also
 Gravitropism

References

External links
 ETH Space Biology Random Positioning Machine
 DESC VU Amsterdam Standard and desktop Random Positioning Machines
Manufacturer's Website: yuri GmbH

Laboratory equipment
Gravitational instruments
Positioning instruments